Hondagua is a railway station located on the South Main Line in Quezon, Philippines. It is still use for the Bicol Express and Isarog Limited.

History
Hondagua was opened on May 10, 1916 as part of the extension of the Main Line South from Padre Burgos to Calauag via Hondagua.

Philippine National Railways stations
Railway stations in Quezon
Railway stations opened in 1916